The SZSE Component Index is an index of 500 stocks that are traded at the Shenzhen Stock Exchange (SZSE). It is the main stock market index of SZSE.

Constituents 

The full list of all constituent stocks can be found at SZSE.

Related indices
 SZSE 300 Index - top 300 companies
 SZSE 100 Index - top 100 companies
 SZSE 200 Index 101st to 300th companies
 SZSE 1000 Index - top 1000 companies
 SZSE 700 Index 301st to 1000th companies
 SZSE Composite Index - index for all shares from all companies of the exchange

See also 
 CSI 300 Index major index of mainland Chinese stock markets
 SSE Composite Index major index of Shanghai Stock Exchange
 Hang Seng Index major index of Hong Kong Stock Exchange of Hong Kong S.A.R., China
 Taiwan Capitalization Weighted Stock Index major index of Taiwan Stock Exchange of Taiwan, Republic of China

External links 
SZSE COMPONENT INDEX
Bloomberg page for SICOM:IND

Chinese stock market indices